Džentlmeni were a Yugoslav rock band formed in Belgrade in 1966.

A year after the formation, the band split into two factions. The first faction featured original rhythm guitarist Milan Buza, and the other featuring original bass guitarist Živorad "Žika" Jelić and drummer Velibor "Boka" Bogdanović, the first disbanding after a year and a half and the second continuing their career with Žika Jelić's brother, Dragan "Dragi" Jelić (guitar), Mihajlo Simikić (tenor saxophone, clarinet, piano and vocals), and Branko Marušić "Čutura" (vocals, rhythm guitar), achieving nationwide popularity and eventually becoming one of the most popular Yugoslav bands of the 1960s. In 1970 the Jelić brothers left Džentlmeni and formed the highly successful band YU Grupa, while Marušić continued to lead Džentlmeni, which changed several lineups. Džentlmeni later lineups included guitarist Zlatko Manojlović (later of Dah and Gordi), bass guitarist Robert Nemeček (later of Pop Mašina and Rok Mašina), guitarist Zoran Božinović (later of Pop Mašina, Rok Mašina and Zona B) and bass guitarist Slađana Milošević (later a successful solo artist), the group finally disbanding in 1972. Although they were not among the earliest Yugoslav rock bands, Džentlmeni, as other Yugoslav 1960s rock bands, played a pioneering role on the Yugoslav rock scene.

History

Band formation and split into two factions (1966–1967) 
The band was formed in 1966 by Slobodan Todorović (guitar and vocals), a former Albatrosi (The Albatrosses) and Alasi (The Fishermen) member Živorad "Žika" Jelić (bass guitar), Milan Buza (rhythm guitar) and Velibor "Boka" Bogdanović (drums). The band got the name Džentlmeni on Todorović's idea, although they also considered Jelić's suggestion of naming the band Žetoni (The Coins). This lineup performed until April 1967, when the band had split in two factions. Todorović did not continue working with any of the factions, moving to Siluete and then to the band CD. Milan Buza, with Branko Stefanović (vocals), Đorđe Doksas (solo guitar), Moma Lukić (drums) and a former Vihori (The Winds) member Dušan Ćućuz (bass guitar, later of the band Tako), performed under the moniker Džentlmeni for approximately a year at local parties before disbanding in 1968. The other faction, featuring Bogdanović and Jelić, continued working with the new Džentlmeni lineup, completed by Mihajlo Simikić (tenor saxophone, clarinet, piano and vocals), a former Iskre and Alasi member Branko Marušić "Čutura" (vocals, rhythm guitar) and Žika Jelić's brother Dragan "Dragi" Jelić (vocals, guitar), who previously played with the bands Alasi, Beduini (The Bedouins) and Siluete. This lineup had a diverse repertoire, playing both beat and rhythm and blues, performing covers of songs by Tom Jones, The Walker Brothers, The Animals, Wilson Pickett, The Jimi Hendrix Experience and other artists, as well as their own material.

The mainstay Džentlmeni (1967-1972) 
During the summer of 1967, the band had an Adriatic coast tour, performing for several months at the isle Hvar and several other resorts. The frequent live performances provided the band with a status of a leading live act in Belgrade and large media attention, which gave them an opportunity to perform as the opening band for Italian singer Caterina Caselli on her concerts in Belgrade, Zagreb, Karlovac and Ljubljana. After these concerts, they had a joined concert with Indexi in Sarajevo and recorded the song "Ne, ne trebam te više" ("No, I Don't Need You Anymore"), written by Đorđe Novković, for the Radio Sarajevo show Vaš šlager sezone (Your Schlager of the Season).

In 1968 the band appeared at the Belgrade Spring festival, with the song "To je tvoj stil" ("It's Your Style"), written by Vojkan Borisavljević. The song was included on the band's 1968 debut extended play, Idi (Go), featuring the title track, a cover version of Sandie Shaw single "Today", "Naša mladost" and "Slatko" ("Sweet"), a cover version of The Drifters hit "Sweets for My Sweet". The EP was well received by the press. During this year the band performed on another major festival, Subotica Youth Festival. On the festival the band performed the songs "Veseli svet" ("Cheerful World"), written by Đorđe Uzelac, and "Naša mladost" ("Our Youth"), written by the band members themselves. The song "Veseli svet" was released on the festival official compilation, along with other acts which performed at the festival.

In 1969 the band released their second EP, Slomljena srca (Broken Hearts), featuring the title track, a cover version of the Don Gibson single "Sea of Heartbreak", "Kraj snova" ("The End of Dreams"), written by Dragi Jelić, "Helule Helule", originally performed by The Tremeloes, and Branko Marušić's song "Nisi došla" ("You Haven't Come"). The title track became a large hit for the band. During this year the band performed again at the Belgrade Spring festival, with the song "Korak ka suncu" ("A Step towards the Sun"), released by PGP-RTB on the official festival compilation.

At the end of the decade the band were at the peak of their popularity; the press described them as the most popular band from Belgrade and they performed as the backing band for popular singers Lidija Kordić and Daliborka Stojšić. However, quarrels in the band became more and more frequent, as the Jelić brothers wanted to move towards progressive rock. The band released their final release in 1970, the single "Ona je moja" ("She Is Mine"), a cover version of the song "34-06", with "Da li su važne reči?" ("Do Words Matter?"), a cover version of the song "There's a Better Day a Comin'", the first originally performed by The Dave Clark Five and the second originally performed by Crazy Elephant.  After the single release, the Jelić brothers and Boka Bogdanović, with keyboard player Miodrag "Mive" Okrugić, formed the progressive/hard rock band YU Grupa. Marušić continued leading Džentlmeni, in the lineup featuring Simikić, a former Helios member Zlatko Manojlović (guitar, later of Dah and Gordi), a former Dogovor iz 1804. member Robert Nemeček (bass guitar, later of Pop Mašina and Rok Mašina), and a former Zlatni Dečaci member Dušan Banović (drums), but the band had frequent lineup changes, with some of the musicians performing with the band including guitarist Zoran Božinović (later of Pop Mašina, Rok Mašina and Zona B) and bassists Dušan Petrović (later of Generacija 5) and Slađana Milošević (later a highly successful solo artist), before disbanding in 1972.

Post breakup
After Džentlmeni disbanded, Marušić formed the band Dah with Zlatko Manojlović. After he left Dah, Marušić dedicated himself to his solo career. He died in 2021 in Belgrade.

The song "Naša mladost" appeared on the various artists compilation 20 godina festivala "Omladina" (20 Years of Youth Festival), released for the Subotica Youth Festival 20th anniversary in 1981. The song "Slomljena srca" appeared on the various artists compilation YU retrospektiva - Sjaj izgubljene ljubavi (YU Retrospective - A Lost Love Spark), released by Komuna in 1994, and the box set various artists compilation Kad je rock bio mlad - Priče sa istočne strane (1956-1970) (When Rock Was Young - East Side Stories (1956-1970)), released by Croatia Records in 2005.

During 2006, the entire band discography was remastered and reissued on the compact disc compilation album Antologija (Anthology), as a part of the PGP-RTS Retrologija (Retrology) series. The album featured a live recording of an early career television performance as well as a part of Marušić's 1994 unplugged performance as bonus.

Legacy
The song "Slomljena srca" was covered by Serbian pop punk band RNDM on their 2016 album Deo mene (Part of Me).

Discography

Extended plays 
 Idi (1968)
 Slomljena srca (1969)

Singles 
 "Ona je moja" / "Da li su važne reči" (1970)

Compilation albums 
 Antologija (2006)

Other appearances 
 "Veseli svet" (Omladina '68; 1968)
 "Korak ka Suncu" (Beogradsko proleće '69; 1969)

References

External links
Džentlmeni at Discogs

Serbian rock music groups
Serbian rhythm and blues musical groups
Yugoslav rock music groups
Yugoslav rhythm and blues musical groups
Beat groups
Musical groups from Belgrade
Musical groups established in 1966
Musical groups disestablished in 1972
1966 establishments in Yugoslavia